Sweden competed at the 1968 Summer Olympics in Mexico City, Mexico. 100 competitors, 86 men and 14 women, took part in 95 events in 13 sports.

Medalists

Gold
 Björn Ferm — Modern Pentathlon, Men's Individual Competition
 Ulf Sundelin, Peter Sundelin, and Jörgen  Sundelin — Sailing, Men's 5½ Meter Class

Silver
 Tomas Pettersson, Erik Pettersson, Gösta Pettersson, and Sture Pettersson — Cycling, Men's Team Time Trial

Bronze
 Gösta Pettersson — Cycling, Men's Road Race

Athletics

Boxing

Canoeing

Cycling

Six cyclists represented Sweden in 1968.

Individual road race
 Gösta Pettersson
 Tomas Pettersson
 Erik Pettersson
 Curt Söderlund

Team time trial
 Erik Pettersson
 Gösta Pettersson
 Sture Pettersson
 Tomas Pettersson

1000m time trial
 Jupp Ripfel

Individual pursuit
 Gösta Pettersson

Team pursuit
 Gösta Pettersson
 Sture Pettersson
 Erik Pettersson
 Tomas Pettersson

Diving

Fencing

Six fencers, five men and one woman, represented Sweden in 1968.

Men's épée
 Orvar Lindwall
 Lars-Erik Larsson
 Dicki Sörensen

Men's team épée
 Dicki Sörensen, Orvar Lindwall, Carl von Essen, Lars-Erik Larsson, Rolf Edling

Women's foil
 Kerstin Palm

Gymnastics

Modern pentathlon

Three male pentathletes represented Sweden in 1968. Björn Ferm won gold in the individual event.

Individual
 Björn Ferm
 Hans Jacobson
 Hans-Gunnar Liljenwall

Team
 Björn Ferm
 Hans Jacobson
 Hans-Gunnar Liljenwall

Sailing

Shooting

Nine shooters, all men, represented Sweden in 1968.

25 m pistol
 Waldemar Califf
 Stig Berntsson

50 m pistol
 Leif Larsson
 Börje Nilsson

300 m rifle, three positions
 Sven Johansson
 Kurt Johansson

50 m rifle, three positions
 Sven Johansson
 Kurt Johansson

50 m rifle, prone
 Sven Johansson
 Kurt Johansson

Trap
 Sten Karlsson

Skeet
 Arne Karlsson
 Arne Orrgård

Swimming

Weightlifting

Wrestling

References

Nations at the 1968 Summer Olympics
1968
1968 in Swedish sport